Transport 5 is a mix album released by Quivver in 2001. It was released on Kinetic Records.

Track listing
Loki – "NYCU (Acappella)" (1:00)
Dark Driver – "Re-Vision 2 (Mara's Empire Of Filth Remix)" (6:31)
Aquilia – "Voodoo (Medway Remix)" (6:45)
DJ Remy – "Radiate (Mike Monday Remix)" (4:44)
Mutiny UK – "The Virus (King Unique's Dirty Dub)" (5:13)
Quivver – "Boz Boz" (6:42)
Hamel & Blackwatch – "Discotek" (4:56)
Sshh – "Hold That Body (Infusion Remix)" (5:38)
Gardner & Thomas – "Propaganda" (5:41)
Loki – "NYCU (James Holden Inertia Remix)" (7:05)
Red Moon – "Basis" (5:36)
Paranoid Jack – "Slave Driver" (4:38)
John Creamer & Stephane K – "I Love You (Hybrid Mix)" (7:54)

External links

2001 compilation albums
Techno compilation albums
Kinetic Records compilation albums